The Battle of Suzdal or the Battle of the Kamenka River was fought on July 7, 1445, between Russians under Vasily II and Tatar troops of Oluğ Möxämmäd, who invaded the principality of Nizhny Novgorod. The Russians were defeated by troops of beg Mäxmüd, who became Mäxmüd of Kazan after the battle. Vasily was taken prisoner and was set free only after the enormous (200,000 roubles) ransom was paid. He also promised restitution of the lands of Mishar Yurt, that were bought from Tokhtamysh in 1343. Qasim Khanate was founded there to become a buffer state and the vassal of Muscovy later.

References

Suzdal
1445 in Europe
Suzdal
15th century in the Grand Duchy of Moscow